Jeff Pollack is an American music executive and film/TV producer. He is currently the head of Pollack Music & Media Group.

Career
As a producer, Pollack has participated in music and charity events over the past decade including U2/Green Day's Music Rising performance at the NFL's reopening game at the Mercedes-Benz Superdome, Live 8, Live Aid, Live Earth, Movies Rock (Emmy-winner), the 2002 Salt Lake City Olympics, the 70th anniversary of the Apollo, and many others.

Jeff served as creative music consultant for the MGM TV series ''Fame L.A.'', which garnered an Emmy Award nomination for its theme song; executive music consultant on Pavorotti's televised concert event for Bosnian war victims featuring U2 and others; co-producer of NetAid; co-executive producer of Billboard Music Awards honoring George Harrison; executive producer of ''Love Rocks''.

As a music supervisor, Pollack has worked on over thirty-five films, five of which received Academy Award nominations for Best Original Song, with ''Crazy Heart’s” "The Weary Kind" winning the Oscar.

Other music supervision film credits: Music Supervisor on the soundtrack for the film ''Glen Campbell: I’ll Be Me'' and Oscar nominated song “I’m Not Gonna Miss You”. Music Supervisor on the film ''August Rush'' and Oscar nominated song “Raise it Up”. Music Supervisor on Oscar-nominated film ''As Good As It Gets'' (1997). Music Consultant on Oscar-nominated film ''Sleepless in Seattle'’ (1993) and Oscar nominated song “Wink and a Smile”. Music Consultant on the film ''Robin Hood: Prince of Thieves'' (1991 and Oscar nominated song “Everything I Do (I’ll Do It For You)”.

Jeff’s music consultant credits include: ''The Space Between Us'' (2017), ''Constantine'' (2005), ''Love Actually'' (2003), “Lara Croft Tomb Raider: the Cradle of Life'' (2003), Red Planet (2000), First Wives Club (1996), You’ve Got Mail'' (1998), The Craft'' (1996), Multiplicity (1996), Moll Flanders'' (1996), ''To Die For'' (1995), The Net'' (1995), Bad Boys'' (1995), My Girl II'' (1994), Threesome'' (1994), I’ll Do Anything'' (1994), It Could Happen To You'' (1994), “Groundhog Day'' (1993), In the Line of Fire'' (1993), ''Hero'' (1992), “Bram Stoker’s Dracula'' (1992), ''Mo’ Money'' (1992).

In 2015, Pollack was a producer on the Alex Gibney-directed, Emmy-nominated HBO film about Frank Sinatra ''All or Nothing At All''. He also served as an associate producer and music supervisor on the Glen Campbell film ''I'll Be Me'', which featured two Grammy-winning songs, including "I'm Not Going to Miss You” which was also nominated for an Oscar for Best Song. ''I'll Be Me'' also recently won a 2016 Grammy for the Best Compilation Soundtrack for Visual Media.

Recent projects include executive producing Satan and Adam, the documentary ‘The Gift: The Journey of Johnny Cash’ which was released on YouTube Originals in November 2019, and the Emmy-nominated 2-part documentary ‘Laurel Canyon’: A Place in Time, which premiered on Epix in May 2020. Jeff was also an executive producer on the Netflix hip-hop competition, ‘Rhythm + Flow’ featuring Cardi B, T.I. and Chance the Rapper, which premiered on Netflix in October 2019. His latest project, ‘McCartney: 3,2,1’ is a 6 part documentary featuring Paul McCartney & Rick Rubin in conversation which premiered on Hulu in 2021. Jeff is also a producer on Michael Connelly’s upcoming feature film “Fair Warning”.

References

American music industry executives
American record producers
American television producers
American music journalists
American radio executives
HuffPost bloggers
Living people
Year of birth missing (living people)